The 1920 Basingstoke by-election was a parliamentary by-election for the British House of Commons constituency of Basingstoke on 31 March 1920.

Vacancy
The by-election was caused by the resignation of the sitting Unionist MP, Auckland Geddes when he was appointed British Ambassador to the United States. He had been MP here since winning the seat in 1917.

Electoral history
The result at the last General Election in 1918 was;

Candidates
The Unionists selected 70-year-old Sir Arthur Holbrook as their candidate to defend the seat. He was a Newspaper proprietor; founder of Southern Daily Mail; Fellow of the Institute of Journalists; President Newspaper Society, 1913–14; Chairman Portsmouth Conservative Association, 1885–98; President Portsmouth Chamber of Commerce, 1907–12; Commanded Royal Army Service Corps, Salisbury Plain District, 1914–19. 

Back in 1919, the Liberals had selected 39-year-old Sir Harry Verney as their prospective parliamentary candidate to challenge for the seat at a future election, so he had nearly a year to establish himself. He had stood before as Liberal candidate for Basingstoke, back in 1906. Verney succeeded to a baronetcy in May 1910. In the December general election of the same year he was returned to Parliament for Buckingham, a seat he held until 1918. He served under H. H. Asquith as Parliamentary Secretary to the Board of Agriculture and Fisheries from 1914 to 1915.
The Labour Party selected  a new, first timer James Round as their candidate to challenge for the seat.
E.T. Judd of the National Farmers' Union put himself forward as a possible candidate. Initially he had sought the Conservative Party nomination before becoming the nominee of the Agricultural party. However, he announced his decision not to contest the seat just before nominations closed.

Campaign
Polling Day was set for 31 March 1920. On 26 March nominations closed to confirm that the election would be a three-way contest.

Holbrook received the official endorsement of the Coalition Government in separate letters from Lloyd George and Bonar Law.

Farming was the dominant issue as the seat was mainly agricultural. By the rejection of Judd, the Unionists lost the support of a large section of farmers who threatened either to abstain from voting or to vote Liberal. For the Labour campaign, Round's chief hope lay in the organized farm labourers.

Result
The Unionists held onto the seat with a much reduced majority, while the Liberals won the battle for second place.

Aftermath
Holbrook defended his seat at the following General Election, while Verney moved to contest Skipton. Round did not stand again. 
The result at the following General Election in 1922 was;

References

See also
 List of United Kingdom by-elections
 United Kingdom by-election records

1920 elections in the United Kingdom
By-elections to the Parliament of the United Kingdom in Hampshire constituencies
1920 in England
Basingstoke
20th century in Hampshire